Harold R. Heaton (died c. 1940) was a mysterious cartoonist who signed his cartoons simply "H.R.H." Little is known about his life, but his prodigious body of work contributed to the development of political cartoons.

Heaton joined the Chicago Daily Tribune in 1885. His illustrations became some of the newspaper's most popular features, and his work was presented on the front page soon after he began working for the Tribune. In 1893, he produced weekly commentaries on the World's Columbian Exposition. This garnered Heaton such acclaim that Anderson's Art Galleries exhibited his illustrations and other works in 1897. In 1908, he joined the Chicago Inter Ocean, a Tribune competitor, as an editorial cartoonist. Although his cartoons with the Inter Ocean began as wide-ranging commentaries on current events, he found his niche within the world of Chicago politics. His cartoons developed a particular focus on Chicago Mayor Fred Busse and State's Attorney John E. Wayman.

Although Heaton was a successful cartoonist, he took a brief, ill-fated hiatus in 1899 to act and write plays. His lack of success drove him to rejoin the world of newspapers in 1908, although he wrote and starred in several more plays following the 1914 end of Inter-Ocean.

He died about 1940, although it is not known exactly how or where.

References

External links
 Harold R. Heaton Political Cartoons at Newberry Library

Year of birth missing
1940 deaths
American cartoonists